Hoima District is a district in Western Uganda. Like most other Ugandan districts, it is named after its main municipal centre, Hoima.

Location
Hoima District is bordered by Buliisa District to the north, Masindi District to the northeast, Kyankwanzi District in the east, Kibaale District to the south, Ntoroko District to the southwest and the Democratic Republic of the Congo across Lake Albert to the west. The coordinates of the district are:01 24N, 31 18E.

Overview
Hoima District, Buliisa District, Kibaale District, Kiryandongo District, Kakumiro District, Kagadi District and Masindi District, constitute Bunyoro sub-region, which is coterminous with the Kingdom of Bunyoro. The palace of the Omukama of Bunyoro is located in Hoima.

Population
During the 1991 national population census, the population of Hoima District was about 197,850. In 2002, the national census that year, estimated the population of the district at bout 343,620, with an annual population growth rate of 2.8%. In 2012, the mid-year district population was estimated at 548,800.

Economic activity
Agriculture with emphasis on food crops is the backbone of the district economy. Crops grown include:

Fishing on Lake Albert employs several hundred people.

The recent discovery of petroleum in the district is increasingly attracting people from the district in the many activities that the industry entails. The Hoima crude oil pipeline project  has created over 10,000 job opportunities to people.

See also
Hoima
Bunyoro sub-region
Omukama of Bunyoro
Western Region, Uganda

References

External links
Hoima District Homepage
About Hoima District

 
Districts of Uganda
Western Region, Uganda
Bunyoro sub-region
Lake Albert (Africa)